Senator Osborne may refer to:

Edward B. Osborne (1814–1893), New York State Senate
F. Edward Osborne (1925–2014), Idaho State Senate
Frank I. Osborne (1853–1920), North Carolina State Senate
Thomas Burr Osborne (politician) (1798–1869), Connecticut State Senate

See also
Senator Osborn (disambiguation)